These are the District Council (Second) functional constituency results of the 2012 Hong Kong legislative election. The election was held on 9 September 2012 and all 5 seats in were contested. The five new seats formed a new constituency under new arrangements agreed in a contentious LegCo vote in 2010, for which candidates may be nominated by the District councillors and are elected by all registered voters who are not in any 'traditional' FC, creating the largest constituency with a total of more than 3.2 million eligible electors. The vote counting system used is the same as that in the GCs: the party-list proportional representation with the largest remainder method and Hare quota.

The pro-democracy camp and pro-Beijing camp each set out three lists aiming for three of the five seats while the largest parties from the both camps, the Democratic Party and the Democratic Alliance for the Betterment and Progress of Hong Kong each put two lists for the contest and the Association for Democracy and People's Livelihood and Hong Kong Federation of Trade Unions, the smaller parties having strong roots in the District Councils put out one list. The other democratic parties which were against the constitutional reform package boycotted the election.

Overall results

Candidates list

Results by districts

Opinion polling

See also
Legislative Council of Hong Kong
Hong Kong legislative elections
2012 Hong Kong legislative election

References

2012 Hong Kong legislative election